Non, non or NON can refer to:

 Non, a negatory word in French, Italian and Latin

People
Non (given name)
Non Boonjumnong (born 1982), Thai amateur boxer 
 Rena Nōnen (born 1993), Japanese actress who uses the stage name "Non" since July 2016
 NON, a name used by musician Boyd Rice

Other uses
 Non (album), The Amenta
 Non! (EP), Big Country
 Non (book), a 2009 book by Japanese model Nozomi Sasaki
 Non (comics), a villain of Superman in the DC Comics universe
 non, language code for Old Norse
 NON Records, an independent record label based in Amsterdam, Netherlands
 Abbreviation of NATO's Allied Forces North Norway Command
 "Non", a song by Phinehas from the album Till the End

See also
 nan (disambiguation)